The Battle of Kathio, or Battle of Izatys, was an oral tradition of the Chippewa reporting a battle fought in 1750 between Chippewas and the Sioux at the village of Kathio, or Izatys, on the Rum River next to Mille Lacs Lake.

According to tradition an old man, living in a Chippewa village at the Fond du Lac (end of the lake), had four adult sons.  They frequently made trips to visit the Sioux and they often returned home with gifts.  During one particular trip one of the sons was killed in a quarrel over a Sioux woman.  The remaining three brothers returned home for a short while, then returned to the Sioux, convinced the death of their brother was a mistake.  However, upon this trip, only one brother returned home to his father safely.  The last son, filled with forgiveness, went to seek the Sioux and reconcile their differences, but only met his death in the Sioux village.

For two years after, the father hunted and worked hard to obtain enough ammunition and supplies to raid the Sioux village and seek his revenge.  As was the custom, he sent his tobacco and war club to the other Chippewa villages asking for help to accompany him "in search of his sons".  The response was overwhelming and a large war party assembled at Fond du Lac.  The Chippewas were victorious, and gained control of the northern part  of what became modern day Minnesota as a result.

To date no archaeological evidence has been found to support the historical validity of this story, although French explorer Daniel Greysolon, Sieur du Lhut did, in 1679, record the existence of 40 Sioux villages in the vicinity.

The last vestige of Sioux domination in this area was broken with the destruction, in about the year 1750, of the great Sioux village of Kathio on the Rum River, near the present village of Vineland.

See also
 Mille Lacs Kathio State Park

Notes

References

External links
National Historic Landmarks program of the National Park Service
National Park Service's Survey of Historic Sites and Buildings: Kathio Site
Transcript of Radiograms of Minnesota History: Sioux versus Chippewa, courtesy of Minnesota Historical Society.

Kathio
Conflicts in 1750
Native American history of Minnesota
1750 in North America